Aaadonta constricta is a species of land snail, a terrestrial pulmonate gastropod mollusk in the family Endodontidae. It is endemic to Palau, where it is known from the islands of Babeldaob, Ngemelis, Peleliu and Koror. It may be extirpated from Koror. It is threatened by habitat destruction and modification.

In 1976, Solem described two subspecies of Aaadonta constricta:
A. c. babelthuapi
A. c. constricta
A. c. komakanensis

References

Endodontoid land snails from Pacific Islands (Mollusca : Pulmonata : Sigmurethra). Alan Solem ... ; [collab.] Barbara K. Solem. Chicago, Ill. :Field Museum of Natural History,1976.
Endodontoid land snails from Pacific Islands (Mollusca : Pulmonata : Sigmurethra). Alan Solem. Chicago :Field museum of Natural History,1982.

Endodontidae
Endemic fauna of Palau
Gastropods described in 1874